The Shoo Fly Complex in the northern Sierra Nevada in California (USA) is a subduction complex of rock metamorphosed to lower greenschist facies.

References

Geology of California